This is a list of Moldovan actors.



A
Beno Axionov

C
 Constantin Cheianu
 Nina Crulicovschi

G
 Grigore Grigoriu

H
 Petru Hadârcă
 Alexandrina Hristov

J
 Valeriu Jereghi

L
 Irina Lachina

R
 Sofia Rotaru

T
 Mihai Timofti
 Valentin Todercan
 Svetlana Toma

U
 Ion Ungureanu
 Gheorghe Urschi

V
 Andrei Vartic
 Mihai Volontir

References

See also
 List of Moldovans

 
Actors
Moldova